Senakah (formerly Seneca) are an Indie/alternative rock band from Limerick, Ireland. Their debut album, Sweeter than Bourbon, produced the single "Clarity", which broke into the Ireland Top 20. Senakah's 2008 American debut was met with positive reviews, and spawned a North American tour in 2008. In 2009 the band spent three months in the United States before embarking on the European leg of their tour.

Style
Senakah incorporates heavy guitar influence along with harmonic vocals and stringed instruments such as the cello and viola. Lead singer Rob Hope has been compared to "Eddie Vedder on his best day."

Sweeter than Bourbon, the debut studio album from the band, deals with Ireland's social issues including domestic violence which is evidenced by the lyrics in their single "Clarity".

Reception
Senakah has been met with positive reception in Europe and North America.

The Second Supper described the band's live performance thus: "No song was vestigial, no member’s contribution was unimportant or repetitive. The spectrum-running creed was adhered to, and it paid off big." 

The band were originally named 'Seneca', but they reported they had to change their name to 'Senakah' to avoid a trademark conflict.

Discography
Sweeter than Bourbon (2008)
Human Relations (2013)

References

External links
Senakah's official website
Senakah's YouTube channel
Senakah's MySpace page
The Second Supper interview and concert review, plus travel piece featuring Senakah
The Second Supper second interview with Senakah

Irish alternative rock groups
Musical groups from Limerick (city)